Carus-Wilson or Carus Wilson is a surname. Notable people with the surname include: 

Cecil Carus-Wilson (1857–1934), British politician
Eleanora Carus-Wilson (1897–1977), British economic historian
William Carus Wilson (1791–1859), English churchman and editor

Compound surnames